The House of Zimri or the Zimri dynasty was a short-lived reigning dynasty of the Kingdom of Israel. It is depicted in the first of the Books of Kings, where it represents a transitional period between the reigns House of Baasha and the Omrides.

The House mainly consists of the king Zimri, who lost a civil war against Omri and committed suicide by self-immolation. In addition, Zimri's successor Tibni has been suggested to be his kinsman or his sibling.

References

Further reading

See also
 House of Baasha
 House of Gadi
 House of Jehu
 House of Jeroboam
 Omride Dynasty